David J. Lubinski is an American psychology professor known for his work in applied research, psychometrics, and individual differences. His work (with Camilla Benbow) has focussed on exceptionally able children: the nature of exceptional ability, the development of people with exceptional ability (in particular meeting the educational needs of gifted children to maximise their talent). He has published widely on the impact of extremely high ability on outputs such as publications, creative writing and art, patents etc. This work disconfirmed the "threshold hypothesis" which suggested that a certain minimum of IQ might be needed, but higher IQ did not translate into greater productivity or creativity. Instead his work shows that higher intelligence leads to higher outcomes with no apparent threshold or dropping off of its impact.

Education 

He earned his B.A. and PhD from the University of Minnesota in 1981 and 1987 respectively. He was a Postdoctoral Fellow at University of Illinois at Urbana-Champaign from 1987 to 1990 with Lloyd G. Humphreys. He taught at Iowa State University from 1990 to 1998 and took a position at Vanderbilt University in 1998, where he currently co-directs the Study of Mathematically Precocious Youth (SMPY), a longitudinal study of intellectual talent, with Camilla Benbow.

In 1994, he was one of 52 signatories on "Mainstream Science on Intelligence", an editorial written by Linda Gottfredson and published in The Wall Street Journal, which declared the consensus of the signing scholars on issues related to intelligence research following the publication of the book The Bell Curve.

In 1996, he won the American Psychological Association Distinguished Scientific Award for Early Career Contribution to Psychology (Applied Research/Psychometrics). In 2006, he received the Distinguished Scholar Award from the National Association for Gifted Children (NAGC).  In addition to this, his work has earned several Mensa Awards for Research Excellence and the organisations Lifetime Achievement Award. He is an APA Division 1 Fellow. He has edited a book with Camilla Benbow, and another with Rene V. Dawis, and has published over 50 refereed journal articles.

Published works

Selected articles

Books (edited)
Benbow CP, Lubinski, D. J. (Eds.) (1996). Intellectual talent: Psychometric and social issues. Johns Hopkins University Press. 
Lubinski DJ, Dawis, R. V. (Eds.) (1995). Assessing individual differences in human behavior: methods, concepts, and findings. Palo Alto, CA: Consulting Psychologists Press.

References

External links
David Lubinski webpage via Vanderbilt
SMPY webpage

Living people
University of Minnesota alumni
Intelligence researchers
21st-century American psychologists
Vanderbilt University faculty
Year of birth missing (living people)
Quantitative psychologists
Differential psychologists